{{Infobox football club 
| clubname = Fotballklubben Haugesund
| image    = FK Haugesund logo.svg
| upright  = 0.9
| fullname = Fotballklubben Haugesund 
| nickname = FKHMaakene (the Seagulls)Englane(the Angels)Araberne (the Arabs)| founded  =  
| ground   = Haugesund StadionCity of Haugesund, Rogaland 
| capacity = 8,754
| chairman = Leif Helge Kaldheim 
| manager  = Jostein Grindhaug 
| mgrtitle = Head coach 
| league   = Eliteserien
| season   = 2022 
| position = Eliteserien, 10th of 16
| website  = http://www.fkh.no/ 
| current  = 2021 FK Haugesund season 
| pattern_la1=_haugesund17h|pattern_b1=_haugesund20h|pattern_ra1=_haugesund17h|pattern_sh1=_haugesund20a|pattern_so1=_haugesund18h
| leftarm1=ffffff|body1=ffffff|rightarm1=ffffff|shorts1=FFFFFF|socks1=ffffff
| pattern_la2=_haugesund17a|pattern_b2=_haugesund20a|pattern_ra2=_haugesund17a|pattern_sh2=_haugesund20a|pattern_so2=_haugesund20a
| leftarm2=0000ff|body2=0000ff|rightarm2=0000ff|shorts2=FFFFFF|socks2=0000ff
| pattern_la3=_haugesund20t|pattern_b3=_haugesund20t|pattern_ra3=_haugesund20t|pattern_sh3=_haugesund20t|pattern_so3=_haugesund18t
| leftarm3=FFF200|body3=FFF200|rightarm3=FFF200|shorts3=FFF200|socks3=FFF200
}}

Fotballklubben Haugesund (English: Football Club Haugesund), usually referred to as FK Haugesund or FKH, is a professional Norwegian football club from the city of Haugesund, Rogaland, Norway. The club currently plays in the Norwegian Eliteserien, the first tier in the Norwegian football league system, after having been promoted in the 2008-2009 season.

FK Haugesund previously played in the top division in 1996-1998 and 2000. The club have been runners-up in the Norwegian Cup in 2007 and 2019 as well as having competed in the qualifying stages for the UEFA Europa League in 2014–15, 2017–18 and 2019–20. The club's best achievement in the national league is the bronze medal in Eliteserien in 2013, and fourth place in the 2016 and 2018-seasons.

It was originally founded on 28 October 1993 after a merger between the Haugesund-based football clubs Djerv 1919 and SK Haugar . Their current head coach is former player, head coach and sporting director Jostein Grindhaug.

The club plays its home matches at the Haugesund stadion near the city-centre of Haugesund. The stadium has a capacity of 8 754. Maakeberget is the official but independent supporter club of FK Haugesund.

History
Domestic history
1993-2000: A new era of football in the city of Haugesund

Fotballklubben Haugesund was originally founded on 28 October 1993 after local Haugesund-based football clubs Sportsklubben Haugar and Djerv 1919 merged their elite teams with the goal of establishing a team, with strong local roots, from the Haugaland-region in the top division in Norway. Teams in age-appropriate classes and for women was originally not a part of the deal in the merger. As of 2017 there have been talks of incorporating a women's team with uncertain future prospects, but with the possibility of a merger with Avaldsnes IL. The local football club SK Vard Haugesund was also present to participate in the merger, but in the first general meeting of the newly formed club, Vard chose to not to be part of the project. In the autumn of 2005, however, talks and negotiations to incorporate Vard were resumed, and since the 2007-season Vard has played the role as a farmer club for FK Haugesund. After FK Haugesund was established as a new club, it swapped places on the table with Sportsklubben Haugar in the 2nd Division, and Haugar and Djerv in 1919 started again in the lower divisions.

In the first season in the divisional system, 1994, FK Haugesund got promoted from the second division, under head-coach Conny Karlsson. Karlsson who unexpectedly did not get his contract renewed at Landskrona after promotion to Allsvenskan, went to take over the newly formed FK Haugesund. This became a formidable success with promotion in the debut season in 1994, a great debut in the 1st division with a 4th place in his second season, before promotion to Tippeligaen in 1996. After an impressive 9th place in Karlssons debut season in the top division, Haugesund got relegated in Karlsson's fifth season in 1998. However, the team again got promoted the following year, but ended with only one year in Tippeligaen. Even if Conny Karlsson's stay at FK Haugesund ended with relegation, he still is a popular figure among the supporter club of FK Haugesund, Maakeberget, 
having named club anthem after him ("Connys Englar")

The 2000s: Relegation, promotion and the Norwegian cup final

After having played four consecutive seasons in the first division after the club's relegation in 2000 from Tippeligaen, FK Haugesund relegated from the 1st division in 2004. The team thus spent the 2005 season in the 2nd division, however, FK Haugesund moved right back up after becoming the best team to advance from the 2nd division. The seasons 2006-2009 the club established itself as a stable team in the first division, under head coach Rune Skarsfjord, with growing potential of promotion to the Tippeligaen. In 2008 however, Rune Skarsfjord became extremely disliked by both players and members of the club and unpopular among fans, due to his brash and unfriendly persona and eventually got sacked and was replaced with former long time-FK Haugesund-player Jostein Grindhaug. The 2009 season was a great success as the team won promotion once again the Tippeligaen. From the 2010 season the team has played in the Tippeligaen, now renamed Eliteserien. At the end of 2009, the club chose to start its own corporation for financial purposes.

The club's best performance in the Norwegian Cup came in 2007 when the club reached the final, as a 2nd division team. However the final at the Norwegian national arena, Ullevaal Stadium, on 11 November 2007, Lillestrøm SK won 2-0 after two goals by Canadian striker Olivier Occean. On their way to the final, FK Haugesund beat Nybergsund in the quarterfinals and Odd Grenland in the semi-final. This was also the fifth time a team from Haugesund has played a final in the cup - previously the city has been represented by Sportsklubben Haugar (1961, 1979), SK Vard Haugesund (1962, 1975). However, all four previous finals in the Norwegian Cup has ended with losses.

The 2010s: A proven club in the Eliteserien

After the promotion in 2009, FKH did relatively well both in terms of sporting results and financially. This meant the team were able to compete on the upper half of the table most seasons, with a team that in large part consisted of homegrown players from the Haugesund/Haugalandet-area.

In financial terms, the club has frequently been praised by sport commentators and journalists for being an effective, meticulous and well-driven club. This is due to the clubs focus on bringing up local talents rather than buying players elsewhere. In 2013 the club presented a profit of NOK 6.6 million NOK before tax, and a market revenues, ticket revenues of NOK 57.5 million in 2013, revenue was almost NOK 10 million more than budgeted (66.3 million). In 2012, the equity was estimated to NOK 6.8 million. At the end of the year it had risen to NOK 11.6 million. In 2019 FK Haugesund could once again present very good financial results, as one of 7 clubs in the Eliteserien. The Norwegian Football Association's presentation of club operations for the first six months of the year. This means that they were back in the green category after falling into the yellow category in the previous two reports.

In the first few years the team ended up in the middle of the table: Two sixth places in the 2010 and 2011 season were followed by a seventh place in 2012. In the 2013 season, the team's preliminary ranking came third, with third place. After the bronze, the results have been poorer, with 11th and 12th place in the following two years, before there was a rise in 2016 with 4 place. 2018 was again a strong year with either good placement in the series with a strong fourth place. In 2019 FK Haugesund reached the cup final for the second time after beating Odd 3–0, but in the final Viking became too strong with a 1–0 victory.

European tournament history

In 2014 FK Haugesund for the first time participated in the qualifying stages of the UEFA Europa League, UEFA Europa League. Welsh team Airbus UK Broughton was beaten 3-2 overall. In the second round Bosnian team FK Sarajevo won 3-2 overall.

In 2017 FK Haugesund once again got to participate in the qualifying stages of the UEFA Europa League. This time, the Northern-Irish team Coleraine easily got beaten 7-0 overall, before a 3–2 win at home over Polish team Lech Poznan thus followed by a 2–0 loss away and exit from the qualifying stages. 
 
In 2019 FK Haugesund got qualified for the UEFA Europa League qualification and went out with the lowest possible margin against PSV in the third qualifying round 0–1 at home, and 0–0 away. FK Haugesund beat Northern Irish Cliftonville in the first round, winning 6-1 overall, before beating Sturm Graz of Austria 2–0 at home in the second round, and 1-2 losses away, and thus 3-2 further overall.

Statistics from recent seasons

Supporters and fan culture

Maakeberget (The Seagull Mountain or The Mountain of Seagulls) is the official but independent supporter club for FK Haugesund. The supporter club was founded on 8 May 1996. The origin of the name "Maakeberget" comes from the 3 gulls in the city's coat of arms and "The mountain inward the fjord and along the sea" when arriving to the city by sea. FK Haugesund has a strong presence in the city of Haugesund as well as in the Haugalandet-area, in general.

Maakebergets residence is the West Stand ("Vestre Stå") at Haugesund Stadion. The West stand is considered sacred ground among the supporters, not because there is anyone buried there, but because the supporters, who have their presence in the said stand, view this terrace as a temple for football in Haugesund. Maakeberget is a non-profit organization with strong democratic principles. There are no criteria that must be met to be a member, nor any age limit. The supporter club holds several member meetings a year, and the Board meets once a month. The board has a certain link to the management of the club, but still strives to keep the board / administration at arm's length. The supporter club also deals with the sale of supporter equipment in its own supporter shop, at the stadium and at Stamstedet on match days. All sales are based on dugnad, with a small profit to the Maakeberget, which goes back in full to the members with the main emphasis on support for away matches.

Maakeberget and supporters of FK Haugesund are often called "Maaker" ("Seagulls"), and sometimes "Arabs" by outside fans and commentators. However, FKH-supporters and people from Haugesund very rarely refer to themselves as "Arabs", and it is by some considered pejorative. A typical "maake" is often described as being born in the city, raised in the Flotmyr-part of the city of Haugesund, has little sympathy for rivals Viking FK and SK Brann, votes for right-wing Høyre or Progress Party (Norway) and has a passion, not only for the football team, but also for the city of Haugesund and the Haugalandet-area as a whole. However, one does not have to be "typical maake" at all to be a passionate supporter of the Fotballklubben Haugesund.

Community activities

FK Haugesund is involved in various community activities, most notably the UngJobb-project.

UngJobb is a collaboration project between FK Haugesund, Haugesund municipality, NAV and Haugaland Industri for youth that is outside the school and labor market. The project provides youth with training, work practices and individual guidance. The project aims the provide training for young people and show what it takes to get to work, as well as good values, attitudes, interactions, affiliation and motivation. The goal of the project is permanent work for all young people who are involved.

FK Haugesund has also been involved in the Abrac project. The project involves fundraising and support for the Abrac orphanage in Brazil.

Club rivalries

The main rival of FK Haugesund is Viking FK, and to a lesser degree SK Brann.

Viking is located in Stavanger, Rogaland, the same county as FK Haugesund. Viking is therefore the geographically closest rival to FK Haugesund, excluding Vard Haugesund. Viking is therefore considered the FKH's most important and biggest rival. Historically, SK Vard Haugesund have been perceived as minor local rivals due to their resistance in forming FK Haugesund in 1993.

The rivalries with Brann and Viking are often referred to as Vestlandsderbyet (the derby of Western Norway).

Stadium and facilities

The stadium has an official capacity of 8,754. The stadium is colloquially referred to as "Gamlå" (the Old One).

Discussions of a new stadium or an upgrade have been carried out since the mid 2000s. In 2005 there was a proposal to build an all-new 8,000-seat stadium at Flotmyr.

In a 2012 survey carried out by the Norwegian Players' Association among away-team captains, Haugesund Stadion was ranked ninth amongst league stadiums, with a score of 3.20 on a scale from one to five.
Haugesund Stadion was previously a multi-purpose stadium, but the running track was removed after the 2012 season.

The venue has hosted Norway national under-21 football team matches twice, playing 1–2 against Denmark on 23 June 1976 and 1–0 against Portugal on 19 April 1994. As of the end of the 2013 season, Haugesund Stadion has been used for 122 top-league matches. These include 11 games with Djerv 1919 in 1976, Vard in 1988 and FK Haugesund in 1997–98, 2000 and since 2010.

Players

Current squad

 For season transfers, see transfers winter 2022–23 and transfers summer 2023.''

Out on loan

Notable former players

  Haris Hajradinovic  Daniel Bamberg
  Chris Pozniak
  Kevin de Serpa
  Milan Kojic
  Paulo Dos Santos
  Carlos Castro
  Rodolfo Rodriguez
  Marko Ćosić
  Allan Olesen
  Christian Gytkjær  Henrik Kildentoft
  Jacob Sørensen
  Martin Christensen
  Pascal Gregor
  Patrick Olsen  Søren Christensen
  Juska Savolainen
  Derek Decamps
  Kwame Karikari
  Mickaël Antoine-Curier
  Victorien Djedje
  Beau Molenaar
  Babajide David Akintola  Bala Garba
  Felix Ademola
  Umaru Bangura  William Troost-Ekong  Alexander Søderlund  Asbjørn Helgeland
  Christian Grindheim
  Eirik Horneland
  Eirik Ulland Andersen  Erik Huseklepp
  Geir Ludvig Fevang
  Håvard Nordtveit  Henrik Kjelsrud Johansen  Jan Kjell Larsen
  Joakim Våge Nilsen
  Jonas Johansen
  Jone Samuelsen
  Jostein Grindhaug 
  Kenneth Høie
  Kjetil Løvvik
  Kristoffer Haraldseid  Martin Bjørnbak  Martin Samuelsen  Michael Haukås
  Morten Berre
  Morten Hæstad
  Morten Moldskred
  Per Kristian Bråtveit  Per Morten Kristiansen
  Stian Ringstad
  Thomas Sørum
  Tor Arne Andreassen
  Torbjørn Agdestein
  Trond Erik Bertelsen
  Trygve Nygaard
  Simon Diedhiou
  Dušan Cvetinović  Nemanja Tubic
  Nikola Đurđić  Nikola Komazec
  Filip Kiss  Rok Elsner
  Liban Abdi  Anders Blomquist
  David Myrestam
  Douglas Bergqvist
  Hasse Berggren
  John Pelu
  Magnus Johansson
  Maic Sema  Pontus Engblom
  Cameron Weaver

Staff

Former and present managers
 Conny Karlsson (1994 – 31 December 1998)
 Age Steen (1 January 1999 – 6 August 2000)
 Kjell Inge Bråtveit (7 August 2000 – 31 December 2002)
 Harald Aabrekk (2002 – 2005)
 Rune Skarsfjord (1 January 2006 – 31 December 2008)
 Jostein Grindhaug (1 January 2009 – 31 December 2015)
 Mark Dempsey (1 January 2016 – 14 July 2016)
 Andrea Loberto (interim) (14 July 2016 – 31 October 2016)
 Eirik Horneland (31 October 2016 – 8 January 2019)
 Jostein Grindhaug (9 January 2019 – present)

HonoursEliteserien:
 Bronze medal: 2013Norwegian Cup:'''
Runners-up: 2007
Runners-up: 2019

References

External links

 

 
Haugesund, F.K.
Sport in Haugesund
Association football clubs established in 1993
1993 establishments in Norway